Nelson is a civil parish in Northumberland County, New Brunswick, Canada.

For governance purposes it is divided between the city of Miramichi, the village of Nouvelle-Arcadie, the incorporated rural community of Miramichi River Valley, and the Greater Miramichi rural district. All are members of the Greater Miramichi Regional Service Commission except Nouvelle-Arcadie, which is part of the Kent RSC.

Prior to the 2023 governance reform, the parish was divided between Miramichi and the local service district of the parish of Nelson; An area upstream of O'Toole Crescent was part of the LSD.

Origin of name
The parish was probably named in honour of Admiral Nelson.

History
Nelson was erected in 1814 from Newcastle Parish.

Nelson included parts of Chatham and Glenelg Parishes until 1850, most of Derby and parts of Southesk until 1859, and most of Rogersville until 1881.

Boundaries
Nelson Parish is bounded:

 on the north by the Southwest Miramichi River and Miramichi River;
 on the east, beginning at a cove northeasterly of the junction of Rasche Street and St. Patrick's Drive, by a line running southeasterly along the northeastern line of a grant to Thomas McCallum and its prolongation to a point seven miles (11.27 kilometres) from the Kent County line;
 on the south by a line seven miles from and parallel to the Kent County line;
 on the west, beginning at a point about 2.25 kilometres west of North Lake, by a line running north 22º west through the mouth of the Renous River;
 including Barnaby Island in the Southwest Miramichi.

Evolution of boundaries
When Nelson was erected it included a strip of Chatham and Glenelg Parishes that ran from the Miramichi River to the modern Kent County line, which included the Douglasfield and Chatham Head areas. The boundary with Northesk Parish was a line running south 68º west from modern Wilsons Point, which cuts repeatedly through the modern line between Derby and Southesk Parishes.

In 1850 the boundary with Chatham and Glenelg was moved west to its present position. The Northesk boundary was moved north to a line running west from Wilsons Point by the magnet of 1850.

In 1856 the boundary with Northesk Parish was changed back to the pre-1850 line.

In 1859 all of Nelson north of the Southwest Miramichi River, along with Beaubears Island, was erected as Derby Parish.

In 1881 all of Nelson within seven miles of the Kent County line was erected as Rogersville Parish.

Communities
Communities at least partly within the parish. bold indicates an incorporated municipality; italics indicate a name no longer in official use

  Barnaby River
  Chelmsford
 Doyles Brook
  Kirkwood
 Lower Barnaby

 McKinleyville
 Passmore
  Renous 12
 Semiwagan Ridge
 Upper Barnaby

  Miramichi
 Craigville
 Ivory Road
  Nelson-Miramichi
  Nowlanville

  Miramichi
 Reynolds
 South Nelson
 South Nelson Road

Bodies of water
Bodies of water at least partly within the parish.
 Barnaby River
 Southwest Miramichi River
 Semiwagan Stream
 Semiwagan Deadwater

Islands
Islands at least partly within the parish.
 Barnaby Island
 Macs Lake

Other notable places
Parks, historic sites, and other noteworthy places at least partly within the parish.
 Semiwagan Meadows Protected Natural Area

Demographics
Parish population total does not include Renous 12 Indian reserve or portion in Miramichi

Population
Population trend

Language
Mother tongue (2016)

See also
List of parishes in New Brunswick

Notes

References

Parishes of Northumberland County, New Brunswick
Local service districts of Northumberland County, New Brunswick